The 1947 Montana State Bobcats football team was an American football team that represented Montana State University in the Rocky Mountain Conference (RMC) during the 1947 college football season. In its second season under head coach Clyde Carpenter, the team compiled a 4–5 record.

The Bobcats defeated cross-state rival Montana on October 18 to win the Copper Bowl trophy. The game drew a crowd of 13,350, the largest crowd to see any sporting event in the state of Montana up to that point.

Schedule

References

Montana State
Montana State Bobcats football seasons
Montana State Bobcats football